Elephant Island may refer to:
Elephant Island in the South Shetland Islands
Elephant Island (Vanuatu)
Elephant Jason Island in the Falkland Islands
Elephanta Island in Mumbai Harbor
Elephantine, an island in the Nile River